Emit may refer to:

Emit, North Carolina, an unincorporated community
Em:t Records, a British record label that specializes in ambient music
Emmet (Cornish), Cornish derogatory slang for a tourist or newcomer
EMIT or Enzyme multiplied immunoassay technique, a common drug test
Emit (video game)

See also
Emitter (disambiguation)
Emission (disambiguation)